Shibuya (written: 渋谷) is a Japanese surname. Notable people with the surname include:

Jinshichi Shibuya, Japanese entomologist
, Japanese video game artist
Kinji Shibuya (1921–2010), American professional wrestler and actor
Kotono Shibuya (born 1975), Japanese actress and singer
, Japanese biathlete
Minoru Shibuya (1907–1980), Japanese film director
Momoko Shibuya (born 1987), Japanese actress
Nagisa Shibuya (born 1996), member of the Japanese idol girl group NMB48
Ryūkichi Shibuya (born 1907), Japanese photographer
Tenma Shibuya (born 1969), Japanese actor, classical dancer, and cultural exchange activist
Kaho Shibuya (born 1991), Japanese media personality

Fictional characters
Kazuya Shibuya, a character in Ghost Hunt
Rin Shibuya, one of the main characters in The Idolmaster Cinderella Girls
Kanon Shibuya, one of the main characters in Love Live! Superstar!!
Tomochika Shibuya, a character in Uta no Prince-Sama
Yuri Shibuya, the main character in Kyo Kara Maoh!

Japanese-language surnames